Richmondoceras is an extinct genus of actively mobile carnivorous cephalopods, essentially a Nautiloid, that lived in what would be North America during the Ordovician and Silurian from 449.5—443.7 mya, existing for approximately .

Taxonomy
Richmondoceras was named by Frey (1995). Its type is Richmondoceras brevicameratum. It was assigned to Orthocerida by Frey (1995).

Morphology
The shell is usually long, and may be straight ("orthoconic") or gently curved.  In life, these animals may have been similar to the modern squid, except for the long shell.

Fossil distribution
Fossil distribution is exclusive to Indiana, USA.

References

Prehistoric nautiloid genera
Ordovician cephalopods of North America
Silurian cephalopods
Silurian extinctions
Paleozoic cephalopods of North America
Ordovician first appearances